The Electric Construction Co. Building is or was a property in Grand Forks, North Dakota.  It was removed from the National Register of Historic Places in 2004.

It was built or has other significance in 1908.  The listing described Early Commercial, Vernacular, and other architecture.  The listing was for an area of less than one acre with just one contributing building.

The property was covered in a 1981 study of Downtown Grand Forks historical resources.

Its listing status is "RN", which means removed from National Register.

References

Former National Register of Historic Places in North Dakota
Buildings designated early commercial in the National Register of Historic Places in North Dakota
Vernacular architecture in North Dakota
Commercial buildings completed in 1908
National Register of Historic Places in Grand Forks, North Dakota
1908 establishments in North Dakota